Hausmeister Krause – Ordnung muss sein (English lit.: Janitor Krause - Order is a must) is a German sitcom with Tom Gerhardt in the title role, shown from 1999 through 2010 on Sat.1.

The series parodies typical German "squareness". Half-day caretaker Dieter Krause is the embodiment of the German "square"; he is pernickety, blindly follows order, denounces others, is nosy, consistently puts his own interests above all else, acts subservient to his superiors and is brutish and unjust to those he deemed below him.

Many plot elements — mishaps, misunderstandings, and frequent cases of mistaken identity  — originate from Boulevard theatre. The characters in the series borrow heavily from those in Tom Gerhardt's film , in many cases sharing names. In Voll normaaal, Tom Gerhardt played the roles of both Dieter and Tommie Krause; in Hausmeister Krause, Tommie was played by Axel Stein. Daughter Carmen is played by Janine Kunze. Other characters from Voll normaaal, such as Tommie's friend Mario, are relegated to the status of background characters. The scope of action also changed.

External links
 

1999 German television series debuts
2010 German television series endings
2000s German television series
German comedy television series
German-language television shows
Live action television shows based on films
Television shows set in Cologne
Sat.1 original programming
Fictional janitors